https://www.linkedin.com/in/dr-susanne-nies-31b29a44/

Susanne Nies is an energy and climate professional. 
She served in various roles across the industry and in think tanks. Positions include, from March 2020 to March 2023, as General Manager Germany DACH at Smart Wires url=https://www.smartwires.com/team/susanne-nies/ |access-date=2022-07-14 |website=Smart Wires Inc. |language=en-US}}</ref>

Biography 
Susanne Nies is a German national by origin. She holds a PhD from Bonn University and a Habilitation from Berlin Free University, as well as Sciences Po Paris, in Political Sciences, in International Relations, as well as a business and an economics degree from London School of Economics.

From 2015 to 2020, Susanne Nies has headed the Corporate Affairs Section of the European Association of Transmission Network Operators, ENTSO-E. Until then she was Head of Unit Distribution System Operators with EURELECTRIC, the European electricity sector association based in Brussels, since June 2014. Before and from 2010 she was heading the Energy Policy and Power Generation Department for the same association.

Previously she was heading the French Institute for International Relations Brussels branch and was affiliated as a senior researcher to the energy programme of the Institute; was working with CERI and IRIS, Free University Berlin, CIFE Nice and Heinrich Boell Foundation. She has a long track of academic publication on energy, international relations and Eastern Europe, affiliation to research and lecturing, as well as consulting. She speaks fluently German, English, French and Russian.

Notes

SELECTED PUBLICATIONS 

Nies, Susanne, The EU’s Plan to Scale up Renewables by 2030: Implications for the Power System | IFRI - Institut français des relations internationales, IFRI Briefings April 2022
Nies, Susanne, European power networks for a zero emissions future: investments, regulation, optimization in: European Energy & Climate Journal Volume 10 Issue 4 (2021) 
Nies, Susanne (Editor and Author), The European Energy Transition: Actors, Factors, Sectors. Prefaced  by Jacques Delors. Claeys&Casteels, 545 p., Deventer 2019
2nd revised and augmented edition: The European Energy Transition: an agenda for the Twenties. 2020.
Nies, Susanne, The active customer paradigm and the transmission-distribution interface, in: European Energy Journal, Claeys and Casteels, Vol 6, Issue 2, September 2016, pp 37-45

Nies, Susanne, L'énergie, facteur d'intégration et de désintégration en Europe: bilan du quart de siècle depuis la chute du mur de Berlin, in: Herodote 155, 2014  

Nies, Susanne, The quest for a European energy “Silicon valley”.  A worthy task for the German-French tandem, DGAP, in:Internationale Politik 2013 (in English and German) 

Nies, Susanne, Erneuerbare Energien im Erzeugungsportfolio: Risiken, Chancen, und die Notwendigkeit eines Europaeischen Entwicklungsweges, Chapter 1, in Nagel, P. (Ed.) Internationales Projektmanagement Erneuerbare Energien, Frankfurt School Verlag, September 2013 

Nies, Susanne, Power Outlook and Capacity Changes after Fukushima, in European Energy Journal, Claeys Castels, September 2011

Nies, Susanne, Setting up new conventional capacity in Europe and EU regulation: an overview and critical assessment of the regulatory environment, VGB Power Tech, 7-2011

Nies, Susanne, At the Speed of the Light?

Nies, Susanne, Ukraine, a transit country in deadlock, Dezember 2009,  www.ifri.org

Nies, Susanne, Gas and Oil to Europe : Perspectives on Infrastructures. Ifri, 220 p., La Documentation Française, July 2008 (English, translated into French and Romanian), 2nd edition published by Technip Paris 2011)

Enclaves in the Postsoviet Space – a Challenge for Russia? The Cases of Kaliningrad, Nagorno-Karabakh and Nakhchivan », Chapter 6, in KANET, Roger (Ed.) –Russia – a re-emerging Great Power ?  Mac Millan, London, 2007

Nies, Susanne, NATO Enlargement: Impact on New Members and NATO as a Member.  International and Strategic Review, No. 59, September 2005 

Nies, Susanne, Enclaves in international relations. LAP Lambert 2015

Nies, Susanne, Nies, Susanne, The energy market in Hungary. State of play and perspectives. Internal consultancy , Paris 2005 (The Energy Market in Hungary. Status Quo and Perspectives. Consultancy)

Nies, Susanne, The energy market in Lithuania. State of play and perspectives. Internal consultancy , Paris 2004 (The Energy Market in Lithuania. Status Quo and Perspectives. Consultancy)

Nies, Susanne, The Baltic States – a long dissent. Armand Colin, Paris 2004

Nies, Susanne. Social Policy in the Russian Federation. Reforms, the New System of Contributions and Remaining Deficits. Paper presented at the BASEES Annual Conference 2003 (British Association for Slavonic and East European Studies), Cambridge march 2003, (unpublished manuscript), http://www.bassees.org.uk/papers/nies.pdf

Nies, Susanne and Gesa Walcher.  Fiscal system and Social Policy In Russia.  Papers Bremen Institute for East European Studies, Bremen: 2001

Nies, Susanne, Lettland in der internationalen Politik, Aspekte seiner Aussenpolitik (Dissertation), Lit Verlag 1995

Nies, Susanne (Ed), Memorial. Aufarbeitung der Geschichte und Gestaltung der Zukunft. Heinrich-Böll-Stiftung, Köln 1990.

Nies, Susanne, Die Stalin(ismus) Debatte in der Sowjetunion. (Master Arbeit, unveröffentlicht), Bonn Rheinische-Friedrich-Wilhelms-Universität, 1989

Living people
Electric power transmission system operators in Europe
21st-century German women writers